The 2016 Hong Kong Sevens was the 41st edition of the Hong Kong Sevens tournament, and the seventh tournament of the 2015–16 World Rugby Sevens Series. The tournament was played on 8–10 April 2016 at Hong Kong Stadium in Hong Kong.

Format
As in the last tournament, there will be a main draw with the fifteen World Series core teams and one invited team, and a qualifying tournament featuring twelve teams, the winner of which will be given core status in the next series.

Teams
The teams confirmed for both the World Series and World Series Qualifier events at the 2016 Hong Kong Sevens are listed below:

Main draw

World Series Qualifier

Main draw

Pool stage

Pool A

Pool B

Pool C

Pool D

Knockout stage

Shield

Bowl

Plate

Cup

World Series Qualifier

Pool stage

Pool E

Pool F

Pool G

Knockout stage

External links

2016
rugby union
2015–16 World Rugby Sevens Series
2016 in Asian rugby union
April 2016 sports events in China